"Don't Talk to Strangers" is a song written and performed by Australian musician Rick Springfield. This song was released as a single in 1982, from the album Success Hasn't Spoiled Me Yet. It reached number two on the United States Billboard Hot 100 for four weeks, making it his second biggest hit in the US after the number-one hit, "Jessie's Girl". It was kept off the top spot by "Ebony and Ivory" by Paul McCartney and Stevie Wonder. Springfield was nominated for Grammy Award for Best Male Pop Vocal Performance with the song in 1983.

Background 

The song was written to Springfield's then-girlfriend Barbara Porter (later his wife), whom he was worried was involved with other people while they were apart. Springfield recalled, "Back then, I was scared that she was screwing around because I was doing the same thing."

Reception
Billboard said that it has "irresistible hooks interspersed throughout." Record World said it has "a snappy rock beat and sharp chorus hook."

Chart history

Weekly charts

Year-end charts

All-time charts

References 

Franglais songs
Rick Springfield songs
Songs written by Rick Springfield
1981 songs
1982 singles
RCA Records singles
Song recordings produced by Keith Olsen